Carabus smaragdinus is a species of beetle belonging to the family Carabidae.

Subspecies
 Carabus smaragdinus branickii Taczanowski, 1887 
 Carabus smaragdinus dolichognathus Deuve, 1995 
 Carabus smaragdinus euviridis (Ishikawa & Kim, 1983) 
 Carabus smaragdinus furumiellus Deuve, 1994 
 Carabus smaragdinus hoenggandoensis (Kwon & Lee, 1984) 
 Carabus smaragdinus honanensis Hauser, 1921 
 Carabus smaragdinus hongdoensis (Kwon & Lee, 1984) 
 Carabus smaragdinus liaodongensis (Li, 1992) 
 Carabus smaragdinus longipennis Chaudoir, 1863 
 Carabus smaragdinus mandschuricus Semenov, 1898 
 Carabus smaragdinus monilifer Tatum, 1847 
 Carabus smaragdinus pinganensis Hauser, 1920 
 Carabus smaragdinus shantungensis Born, 1910 
 Carabus smaragdinus smaragdinus Fischer, 1823 
 Carabus smaragdinus yanggangensis Deuve & Li, 2000 
 Carabus smaragdinus zhongtiaoshanus Imura & Yamaya, 1994

Description
Body is quite slender and the surface is metallic green or reddish coppery, depending on subspecies. Elytra are broad, robust and longitudinally crossed by rows of small dotted points like bumps. Adults can be found from May through September. They mainly eat small creatures like the earthworm.

Distribution
This species is native to the Far East. It can be found in North and South Korea, and in China; from Inner Mongolia to Jilin and Henan to the east and Shanxi to the west.

References

 Biolib

External links

 Beetles of Russia
  Naris

smaragdinus
Beetles of Asia
Beetles of Europe